Morning Glory is a census-designated place (CDP) in El Paso County, Texas, United States. The population was 651 at the 2010 census. It is part of the El Paso Metropolitan Statistical Area. The ZIP Code encompassing the CDP area is 79836.

Geography

Demographics
As of the census of 2000, there were 627 people, 145 households, and 140 families residing in the CDP. The population density was 585.1 people per square mile (226.2/km2). There were 161 housing units at an average density of 150.3/sq mi (58.1/km2). The racial makeup of the CDP was 88.68% White, 0.48% Native American, 10.53% from other races, and 0.32% from two or more races. Hispanic or Latino of any race were 96.33% of the population.

There were 145 households, out of which 66.9% had children under the age of 18 living with them, 80.7% were married couples living together, 11.0% had a female householder with no husband present, and 3.4% were non-families. 2.8% of all households were made up of individuals, and 0.7% had someone living alone who was 65 years of age or older. The average household size was 4.32 and the average family size was 4.41.

In the CDP, the population was spread out, with 42.4% under the age of 18, 10.4% from 18 to 24, 28.2% from 25 to 44, 15.2% from 45 to 64, and 3.8% who were 65 years of age or older. The median age was 23 years. For every 100 females, there were 103.6 males. For every 100 females age 18 and over, there were 97.3 males.

The median income for a household in the CDP was $31,154, and the median income for a family was $30,096. Males had a median income of $21,250 versus $13,750 for females. The per capita income for the CDP was $7,754. About 8.9% of families and 10.4% of the population were below the poverty line, including 16.4% of those under age 18 and none of those age 65 or over.

Education
Morning Glory is served by the Clint Independent School District.

References

Census-designated places in El Paso County, Texas
Census-designated places in Texas